Statistics of L. League in the 1990 season. Yomiuri SC Ladies Beleza won the championship.

JLSL League standings

League awards

Best player

Top scorers

Best eleven

Best young player

See also 
 Empress's Cup

External links 
  Nadeshiko League Official Site

Nadeshiko League seasons
L
Japan
Japan
1990 in Japanese women's sport